Jingwu Yingxiong Chen Zhen, also known as Legend of Chen Zhen, is a Chinese television series based on the story of Chen Zhen, a fictional apprentice of the Chinese martial artist Huo Yuanjia. The series is a sequel to the 2001 television series The Legend of Huo Yuanjia, with Wu Yue reprising his role as Chen Zhen.

Plot 
The series is set in the Warlord Era of early 20th-century China. Chen Zhen, an apprentice of Huo Yuanjia, has been hiding in Foshan after avenging his master. One day, he receives a message and decides to return to Shanghai, where he sees a brothel standing on the old location of the Jingwu School founded by his master. He faces the insurmountable task of rebuilding the Jingwu School while shouldering the responsibility of raising his master's orphaned son, Huo Dongjue. At the same time, he runs into trouble with the gangs and has to hide from the police too.

Chen Zhen's friend, Xi Feiyang, was originally a teacher who came to Shanghai with a passion to serve his country. However, his dreams were shattered when his wife and unborn child were killed by gangsters. Xi Feiyang realises that in such a chaotic era, the only way to survive is to resort to violence, so he gets involved in the criminal underworld and eventually becomes a powerful gang boss. On the other hand, although Chen Zhen ultimately revives his master's legacy and restores the Jingwu School to its former glory, he is betrayed by his fellows and ends up badly injured.

In the meantime, the Japanese are aggressively making plans for another invasion of China. The Japanese government sends Tenkou Jiro, the best fighter in Japan, to challenge Chen Zhen. After Tenkou Jiro loses to Chen Zhen in a fight, he comes to the conclusion that Japan can never conquer China. Just then, Chen Zhen discovers another sinister plot by the Japanese to invade China. Xi Feiyang sacrifices himself to save Chen Zhen.

Cast 
 Wu Yue as Chen Zhen
 Vincent Zhao as Huo Yuanjia
 Qi Yan as Tang Xiaoting
 Yu Rongguang as Xi Feiyang
 Yaqi as Su Jiumei
 He Sirong as Senhyaku Keiko (Qianbai Huizi)
 Zhou Yue as He Ziyi
 Zhao Yansong as Liu Zhensheng
 Wang Huichun as Du Meng
 Zhuo Fan as Tenkou Jiro (Tiangang Cilang)
 Xie Yunshan as Huo Dongjue
 Jin Song as Fishmonger Qiang
 Kou Zhanwen as Du Qimei
 Zhao Yi as Xu Aji

External links 
 Legend of Chen Zhen (2002)

2001 Chinese television series debuts
Martial arts television series
Television shows set in Shanghai
Mandarin-language television shows
Chinese action television series
Sequel television series